The Quimera Concept Electric Car is prototype electric vehicle with a claimed top speed of 300 km/h.

Quimera performed tests in August 2011, at Ciudad del Motor de Aragón, Spain.

References 

Electric concept cars